Alkalihalobacillus caeni is a Gram-variable, aerobic and motile bacterium from the genus of Alkalihalobacillus which has been isolated from sediments from the Bamen Bay mangrove forest in China.

References

Bacillaceae
Bacteria described in 2020